Herbert Gurschner (27 August 1901 – 10 January 1975) was a British painter. His work was part of the painting event in the art competition at the 1948 Summer Olympics.

References

1901 births
1975 deaths
20th-century British painters
British male painters
Olympic competitors in art competitions
Artists from Innsbruck
20th-century British male artists